El Curandero is a 1955 Argentine film directed by Mario Soffici.

Cast

External links
 

1955 films
1950s Spanish-language films
Argentine black-and-white films
Films directed by Mario Soffici
1950s Argentine films